Woodbury High School, formerly Woodbury Senior High, is a high school serving grades 912 in Woodbury, Minnesota, United States. It is part of the South Washington County Schools. The school's mascot is 'Roar the Lion' and the school colors are blue and white.

Overview
Enrollment for the school is about 1,933 students. This is one of the three public high schools in the district. WHS follows a three-trimester, six-period schedule with about 54 minutes in each class. Woodbury High School is rated 9 out of 10 by Great Schools.

Academics
All schools in Minnesota are required by law to administer the Minnesota Comprehensive Assessment test, better known as the MCA, a standardized test used to measure student and school performance. In 2017 Woodbury High School scored 66.9% proficient in Mathematics, 74.4% proficient in Reading, and 77.9% proficient in Science. Compared to statewide results, Woodbury scored 8.3, 14.2, and 23.7 percentage points higher in proficiency respectively.

The school average composite ACT score is 23.6.

Woodbury High School is the 16th highest ranked high school in Minnesota by U.S. News & World Report, earning its Silver award. GreatSchools.org gave Woodbury a 10 out of 10 GreatSchools rating. In 2014 Newsweek magazine ranked Woodbury High School as the 45th best high school in the United States, placing it as 2nd best in Minnesota. Niche (company) gave Woodbury High School the title of fourth best high school in Minnesota.

Athletics

Girls Basketball 
The girls basketball team won the AAAA Minnesota State Championship in 2003, finishing the season with a record of 29-0. Other highlights for the girls basketball team under coach Dave Preller from 1987 to 2011 include: 10 State Tournament appearances and a winning percentage of .808 (512 wins, 122 losses).

Boys Basketball 
The boys basketball team won the AA Minnesota State Championship in 1983. The team went undefeated (24-0), the season culminating with a 56-50 overtime victory over Coon Rapids (featuring future NBA player Tom Copa) in the state final.

Shirt incident 
In 2001 the school created homophobia-free areas called "safe zones" designated by an inverted pink triangle and intended for gay students.  Student Elliot Chambers reacted by wearing a makeshift sweatshirt with the slogan "Straight Pride" and the image of male and female stick figures holding hands.   In light of previous anti-gay incidents, the school's principal ordered Chambers to remove the shirt, and a court case ensued.  A court upheld Chambers' complaint that his First Amendment rights had been violated, and that the principal's decision was unjustified.  Although praising the principal's intentions, the judge explained that views of both sides of the debate should be allowed and that such issues should be resolved within the school's community, not within the court system.  Under the Tinker case, the court stated that the substantial disruptions claimed by the school must be shown to have some connection to Chambers' sweatshirt message of "Straight Pride".

Music department
The Woodbury Music Department supports a very comprehensive music program. The program includes 3 concert bands, 2 jazz ensembles, a marching band, a pep band, 3 orchestras, and 2 chamber orchestras

School Bands
Woodbury High School hosts a varsity band, a symphony band, a concert band, and a marching band.

Varsity Band
The Varsity Band is composed to mostly high school freshmen, but may include older students who are restarting their band process.

Concert Band
The Concert Band is the advanced level band and is the band program's premier and award-winning performing ensemble.   In the year 2016, the Concert band traveled to Denver, Colorado.

Jazz Ensembles
The Woodbury HS Jazz Ensembles perform jazz music of many styles when they appear in community events and concert performances. Jazz events begin in late November as the Marching Band season comes to an end.

Marching Royals
The Marching Royals are made up of an all-volunteer group of students from grades 9-12 who are a part of the Woodbury High School Band Program. The Woodbury Royals marching band performs at every home football game under the lights.

The Marching Royals have performed across the nation; including the 2013 Saint Patrick's Day Parade in New York City, halftime at a Minnesota Vikings game at Mall of America Field in the fall of 2013, and in front of 30,000 spectators in the Disney Festival of Fantasy parade at Disney World in Orlando, FL. During the Fall of 2016 the Marching Royals played at the 75th anniversary of the Pearl Harbor attack in Hawai'i.

Pep Band
The Woodbury High School Pep Band is composed of all the members of the band program.  As a part of regular band class, students perform for select athletic events throughout the school year. The Pep Band also accompanies select Woodbury sports teams to state.

Orchestras
Woodbury High School has three orchestras along with two chambers. The three orchestras are: Varsity, Sinfonia, and Concert.

Choir
Woodbury High School has three choirs, Varsity, Choralaires, and Concert choir. Over president's day weekend all the choirs went to Chicago to Preform.

Royal Theater
In 2023 The Royal Theater was 3AA One Act runner-up.

Notable alumni 
Woodbury High School has been attended by several persons of note, including:
 Louis Ayeni, former NFL player
 Michelle Fischbach, US Representative and former Minnesota Lieutenant Governor
 Kate Hughes, former LPGA tour golfer
 Chip Lohmiller, former NFL player
 Max Meyer, 1st round pick (3rd overall) MLB Draft, 2020, Miami Marlins
 Eric C. Tostrud, United States District Judge of the United States District Court for the District of Minnesota.
Michelle Young, Reality TV star, The Bachelor Season 25 (runner up) and the star of The Bachelorette Season 18

Notable faculty 
Woodbury High School teachers of note:
 Len Price, Social Studies teacher and Minnesota State Representative and Senator

References

External links
 

Public high schools in Minnesota
Schools in Washington County, Minnesota